Qarah Dash (also Romanized as Qarah Dāsh and Qareh Dāsh; also known as Deh-e Qareh Dāsh and Deh Qara Dāsh) is a village in Malmir Rural District, Sarband District, Shazand County, Markazi Province, Iran. At the 2006 census, its population was 33, in 10 families.

References 

Populated places in Shazand County